Merrimac is an unincorporated community located in Mingo County, West Virginia, United States. Its post office is closed.

Merrimac is a name derived from a Native American language meaning "swift water".

References 

Unincorporated communities in West Virginia
Unincorporated communities in Mingo County, West Virginia
Coal towns in West Virginia